"Star" is a song by Scottish rock band Primal Scream. It was released on 16 June 1997 as the second single from their fifth studio album, Vanishing Point (1997). It peaked at number 16 on the UK Singles Chart. NME named it the 27th best track of 1997.

Track listing
All tracks were written and composed by Gillespie, Innes, Young, and Duffy.

Personnel
Credits are adapted from the liner notes.
 Bobby Gillespie – vocals; drums and tambourine on "How Does It Feel to Belong"
 Robert Young – lead guitar
 Andrew Innes – rhythm guitar; "Bhangra Box" on "How Does It Feel to Belong"
 Martin Duffy – keyboards
 Marco Nelson – bass guitar 
 Augustus Pablo – melodica 
 Andrew Love – saxophone
 Wayne Jackson – trumpet
 Pandit Dinesh – tabla

Charts

References

External links
 

1997 singles
1997 songs
Creation Records singles
Primal Scream songs
Songs about Martin Luther King Jr.
Songs written by Andrew Innes
Songs written by Bobby Gillespie
Songs written by Martin Duffy (musician)
Songs written by Robert Young (musician)